= Vladimir Lyubarov =

- Владимир Семёнович Люба́ров
- Born: Vladimir Semyonovich Lyubarov; 4 September 1944 (age 80); Moscow, Russia
- Website: www.lubarov.ru

Vladimir Semyonovich Lyubarov (Russian: Владимир Семёнович Люба́ров; born 4 September 1944, Moscow) is a Russian painter and graphic artist. He has been a member of the Russian Union of Artists since 1985.
